The Tünel (designated as the F2 line on the Istanbul transport map) is a historic underground funicular line in Istanbul, Turkey. It has two stations, connecting Karaköy and Beyoğlu. Inaugurated on 17 January, 1875, the Tünel is the second-oldest fully underground urban railway in the world, after the London Underground (1863) and oldest in continental Europe, pre-dating the Budapest Metro by 21 years.

History
In the second half of the 19th century the neighborhoods of Pera (modern day Beyoğlu) and Galata (modern day Karaköy) had become the financial and commercial heart of Constantinople (modern day Istanbul) and the Ottoman Empire. Many Ottoman and foreign companies, mostly banks and insurance companies, set up their headquarters in these two neighborhoods. Foreign embassies, hotels and commercial markets in Pera were located at the top of a steep hill while the stock exchange, banks and ports in Galata were at the bottom. Travelling between these two districts was challenging, since grades were as steep as 24%. The main street between these two areas, Yüksek Kaldırım (High Pavement) Avenue, saw an average of 40,000 people walking up and down it daily.

In 1867 a French engineer, Eugène-Henri Gavand, went to Istanbul, (Constantinople) as a tourist. During his visit, he was taken aback to see the number of people struggling up and down Yüksek Kaldırım Avenue. Gavand came up with the idea of building a funicular railway that would ascend and descend the hill and went back to France shortly after to prepare his project. He returned to Constantinople in February 1868 to present his project to the Sublime Porte. The railway would start from near Yüksek Kaldırım Avenue at a point close to the Galata Bridge in Galata.

On 10 June 1869 Sultan Abdülaziz granted Gavand a concession to build the railway. He worked with shareholders in France to start a company to build the railway, but eventually the Prussian invasion of France made the formation of a French-based company impossible.

During the war, Gavand went to the United Kingdom and formed the Metropolitan Railway of Constantinople to develop the line. Construction began on 30 July 1871 but was delayed by conflicts between landowners and the company. The tunnel was not completed until December 1874,  and finally opened for service on 17 January 1875. Gavand was notably absent at the opening ceremony.

The Metropolitan Railway company gained a fresh 75-year concession in 1904. In 1911, after some alterations, the rights to the Tünel were transferred to the new multinational consortium, Union Ottoman Société d'Intrepises Electriques à Constantinople. which encompassed the Tünel, the trams, and the Ottoman Joint Stock Electric Company. In 1939 it was absorbed into the new IETT (İstanbul Elektrik Tramvay ve Tünel) transportation organization. 

In 1968 the Tünel was closed for renovation. In 1971 it reopened, having been modernised and electrified. In 2007 the Tünel was restored again to strengthen its seismic resistance in a city prone to earthquakes  

Today, the short line is still a crucial component of the municipal transport network.

Description

It has one station at either end:
 Karaköy — the lower station, located at the eastern end of Tersane Avenue
 Tünel — the upper station on Tünel Square (Tünel Meydanı), located at the southern end of Istiklal Avenue

The gradient of the tunnel varies along its length from 2 percent to 15 percent. Originally built with two parallel tracks, the modern Tünel has a single track with a passing loop in the middle, a short duplex section, where two trains pass side by side.

Rolling stock

The original rolling stock consisted of two wooden two-car trains. One car was reserved for passengers, with its two classes provided divided into separate sections for men and women. The other car was used to transport goods, animals and carts. Motive power was provided by steam engines.

The wooden carriages were replaced in 1971 with two electrified steel cars running on pneumatic tires over concrete tracks, thus similarly to the rubber-tyred metro it could be called a rubber-tyred funicular.

In 2007 a new generation of a rolling stock was brought into operation. A trip from top to bottom takes about 1.5 minutes, with normal waiting time 3.5 minutes. In 2021 the first female driver joined the staff of the Tünel.

Gallery

See also
 Istanbul Kabataş–Taksim funicular
 Istanbul Metro
 Istanbul modern tramways
 Istanbul nostalgic tramways
 Public transport in Istanbul
 List of funicular railways

References

External links

 İETT - Tunnel — the official portal 

Beyoğlu
Rail transport in Istanbul
Railway lines opened in 1875
Rapid transit in Turkey
Standard gauge railways in Turkey
Underground funiculars
Articles containing video clips
Funicular railways in Istanbul